A bombolone (pl. bomboloni)  is an Italian filled doughnut (similar to the Berliner, krafne, pączek etc.) and is eaten as a snack food and dessert. The pastry's name is etymologically related to bomba (bomb), and the same type of pastry is also called bomba (pl. "bombe") in some regions of Italy. The etymological connection is probably due to the resemblance to a grenade or old-fashioned bomb and may today possibly also be regarded as a reference to the high calorie density of this recipe (i.e., a "calorie bomb").

History
While bomboloni may be primarily connected to Tuscany, they are traditional to other regions of Italy, although with slight variations on the recipe. In those areas that used to be under Austrian rule, such as Trentino Alto-Adige, Veneto and Friuli-Venezia Giulia, the tradition of bomboloni is believed to have originated from that of Austrian "krapfen" (i.e., Berliner), and the recipe includes eggs, which are not found in the Tuscan variety.

Pasticcerie sometimes have handwritten signs for them, and food writer Emily Wise wrote that visitors might not be as taken with hot filled doughnuts in an area with wild boar salami and sandwiches with truffle oil on offer, but that residents of Tuscany enjoy them even at the beach. They are also sold from carts on the beach and are a bit distinct from the filled doughnuts in other countries by having the filling put in from the top, where it is sometimes visible, rather than injected from the side.

The A Voce restaurant in New York has served them with chocolate sauce and Florentines have been said to prefer the bomboloni caldi (hot) at Buscioni, where they're served "straight from the oven" and filled with custard, chocolate, or marmalade.

Italian singer Gianna Nannini's 1996 compilation is titled Bomboloni and includes the song "Bomboloni" with lyrics about hot doughnuts and bombs. The music video features tribal dancing, costumes, round black bombs with fuses, and many doughnuts being eaten, hit with baseball bats, and thrown around.

See also

References

External links

__notoc__

Italian pastries
Italian doughnuts
Stuffed desserts